Gilbert Umfreville Laws (6 January 1870 – 3 December 1918) was a British sailor who competed in the 1908 Summer Olympics. He was the helmsman of the British boat Dormy, which won the gold medal in the 6 metre class.

References

External links 
 
 
 

1870 births
1918 deaths
British male sailors (sport)
Sailors at the 1908 Summer Olympics – 6 Metre
Olympic sailors of Great Britain
English Olympic medallists
Olympic gold medallists for Great Britain
Olympic medalists in sailing
Medalists at the 1908 Summer Olympics